The Panama Canal Division was a unit of the United States Army, established in order to ensure the United States could adequately defend the Canal Zone in Panama. When it was authorized in 1920, similar divisions were organized to defend Hawaii and the Philippines.

History

10th Division

On July 9, 1918, the 10th Division was activated for World War I. It was organized in August, and mobilized and trained at Camp Funston, Kansas. The 10th Division completed training in October and moved to Camp Mills, New York to await transport to France. Advance units of the division had departed Camp Mills by early November, but the Armistice of November 11, 1918 ended the need for the division to serve overseas. Most units had been demobilized by early 1919, and the 10th Division was inactivated in March.

Organization
The organization of the 10th Division included:

Divisional Troops
Headquarters Troop
28th Machine Gun Battalion
210th Engineer Battalion
210th Field Signal Battalion

19th Infantry Brigade
41st Infantry Regiment
69th Infantry Regiment
29th Machine Gun Battalion

20th Infantry Brigade
20th Infantry Regiment
70th Infantry Regiment
30th Machine Gun Battalion

10th Field Artillery Brigade
28th Field Artillery Regiment
29th Field Artillery Regiment
30th Field Artillery Regiment
10th Trench Mortar Battery

Trains
10th Train Headquarters and Military Police
10th Ammunition Train
10th Supply Train
210th Engineer Train
10th Sanitary Train

Commanders
Commanders of the 10th Division included:

Major General Leonard Wood, August 10, 1918 - January 6, 1919
Brigadier General Howard Russell Hickok, January 7, 1919 - January 16, 1919
Major General Leonard Wood, January 17, 1919 - February 18, 1919

Panama Canal Division
The Panama Canal Division was organized in 1921 and included units of the 10th Division that had not been inactivated after World War I. The Panama Canal Division was active until 1932. Its initial composition included the 19th Infantry Brigade commanding the (14th and 65th Infantry Regiments, of which the 65th was stationed in Puerto Rico) and the 20th Infantry Brigade commanding the (33rd and 42nd Infantry Regiments). The two brigades appear to have been active until 1927.

The commander of the Panama Canal Department, Major General Preston Brown, later determined that the defense of Panama would be better served by command groups representing the Atlantic and the Pacific. In 1932, the Army inactivated the division, keeping its Tables of Organization on file should the need arise to reactivate it. It never has.

Commanding generals

Panama Canal Division
BG Edwin B. Babbitt: July 3, 1921 – October 10, 1921
MG Samuel D. Sturgis Jr.: October 10, 1921 – April 17, 1923
MG Edwin B. Babbitt: April 17, 1923 – September 15, 1923
MG William Lassiter: October 1923 – September 19, 1924
BG Fox Conner: September 19, 1924 – January 1925
MG Charles H. Martin: January 23, 1925 – October 10, 1926
MG William S. Graves: December 13, 1926 – October 1, 1927
MG Malin Craig: October 13, 1927 – March 31, 1928
MG George LeRoy Irwin: April 1, 1928 – December 21, 1930
BG Charles DuVal Roberts: December 21, 1930 – April 3, 1931
BG Harold B. Fiske: April 3, 1931 – April 15, 1932

Panama Mobile Force
MG Ben Lear: February 16, 1940 – September 20, 1940
MG William E. Prosser: September 21, 1940 – March 1942
MG Robert H. Lewis: March 1942 – December 21, 1942
MG Harry C. Ingles: December 22, 1942 - February 1943 	
BG Jesse C. Drain: February 1943 - April 2, 1943
MG Phillip E. Gallagher: September 3, 1944 – April 1, 1945 	
BG Thomas J. Camp

See also
Divisions of the United States Army
List of former United States military installations in Panama

References

Divisions of the United States Army
Military units and formations established in 1921
1932 disestablishments
History of Panama
Military history of Panama
Military units and formations disestablished in 1932
United States Army divisions of World War I